Llandeloy is a small village and parish in Pembrokeshire, South West Wales. Together with the parishes of Brawdy and Llanreithan, it constitutes the community of Brawdy, which had a census population of 611 in 2001.

Location

Name
There is no firm evidence for the origin of the name of the religious site from which stemmed the present parish. B. G. Charles, in his Place-names of Pembrokeshire says: Melville Richards in Enwau Tir a Gwlad opts for "...Ty + Llwyf giving Llandylwyf and a contracted Llan-lwy". Some toponymists agree, but Tylwyf is not a recognised saint.

History
Recorded history begins in 1307, but signs of occupation from the bronze age and iron age indicate much longer history. The Royal Commission recorded the place name existing as early as 1291.

The parish's population in the early 1800s was 217, in a few scattered settlements. The parish population was around 200 until the 1950s, when it increased by 10 per cent. At least until the end of the 19th century, the village had a pub, the Llandeloy Arms.

In the 20th century, the village expanded with the proximity of RAF Brawdy.

Worship
The parish church of St Teilo, closed since 2002, is in the care of Friends of Friendless Churches and is a Grade II listed building.

There is a Welsh Calvinist Methodist chapel nearby, at Treffynnon.

See also
 St Teilo's Church, Llandeloy

References

External links 

Further historical information and sources on GENUKI

Villages in Pembrokeshire